SciPy (pronounced  "sigh pie") is a free and open-source Python library used for scientific computing and technical computing.

SciPy contains modules for optimization, linear algebra, integration, interpolation, special functions, FFT, signal and image processing, ODE solvers and other tasks common in science and engineering.

SciPy is also a family of conferences for users and developers of these tools: SciPy (in the United States), EuroSciPy (in Europe) and SciPy.in (in India). Enthought originated the SciPy conference in the United States and continues to sponsor many of the international conferences as well as host the SciPy website.

The SciPy library is currently distributed under the BSD license, and its development is sponsored and supported by an open community of developers. It is also supported by NumFOCUS, a community foundation for supporting reproducible and accessible science.

Components
The SciPy package is at the core of Python's scientific computing capabilities. Available sub-packages include:
 cluster: hierarchical clustering, vector quantization, K-means
constants: physical constants and conversion factors
 fft: Discrete Fourier Transform algorithms
 fftpack: Legacy interface for Discrete Fourier Transforms
 integrate: numerical integration routines
 interpolate: interpolation tools
 io: data input and output
 linalg: linear algebra routines
 misc: miscellaneous utilities (e.g. example images)
 ndimage: various functions for multi-dimensional image processing
ODR: orthogonal distance regression classes and algorithms
 optimize: optimization algorithms including linear programming
 signal: signal processing tools
 sparse: sparse matrices and related algorithms
 spatial: algorithms for spatial structures such as k-d trees, nearest neighbors, Convex hulls, etc.
 special: special functions
 stats: statistical functions
 weave: tool for writing C/C++ code as Python multiline strings (now deprecated in favor of Cython)

Data structures
The basic data structure used by SciPy is a multidimensional array provided by the NumPy module. NumPy provides some functions for linear algebra, Fourier transforms, and random number generation, but not with the generality of the equivalent functions in SciPy. NumPy can also be used as an efficient multidimensional container of data with arbitrary datatypes. This allows NumPy to seamlessly and speedily integrate with a wide variety of databases. Older versions of SciPy used Numeric as an array type, which is now deprecated in favor of the newer NumPy array code.

History
In the 1990s, Python was extended to include an array type for numerical computing called Numeric (This package was eventually replaced by Travis Oliphant who wrote NumPy in 2006 as a blending of Numeric and Numarray which had been started in 2001). As of 2000, there was a growing number of extension modules and increasing interest in creating a complete environment for scientific and technical computing. In 2001, Travis Oliphant, Eric Jones, and Pearu Peterson merged code they had written and called the resulting package SciPy. The newly created package provided a standard collection of common numerical operations on top of the Numeric array data structure. Shortly thereafter, Fernando Pérez released IPython, an enhanced interactive shell widely used in the technical computing community, and John Hunter released the first version of Matplotlib, the 2D plotting library for technical computing. Since then the SciPy environment has continued to grow with more packages and tools for technical computing.

See also

 Comparison of numerical-analysis software
 List of numerical-analysis software
 Comparison of statistical packages
 SageMath
 HiGHS optimization solver

Notes

Further reading

External links
 

Cross-platform software
Free science software
Numerical analysis software for Linux
Numerical analysis software for macOS
Numerical analysis software for Windows
Numerical programming languages
Python (programming language) scientific libraries
Software using the BSD license